Text may refer to:

Written word
 Text (literary theory), any object that can be read, including:
Religious text, a writing that a religious tradition considers to be sacred
Text, a verse or passage from scripture used in expository preaching
Textbook, a book of instruction in any branch of study

Computing and telecommunications
Plain text, unformatted text
Text file, a type of computer file opened by most text software
Text string, a sequence of characters manipulated by software
Text message, a short electronic message designed for communication between mobile phone users
Text (Chrome app), a text editor for the Google Chrome web browser

Arts and media
TEXT, a Swedish band
Text & Talk (formerly Text), an academic journal
"Text", a 2010 song produced by J.R. Rotem, featuring Mann and Jason Derulo
TxT (film), a 2006 Filipino horror film
Text (film), a 2019 Russian film
Text (2008 film) (film), a 2008 American horror film

See also